Münchenstein railway station is a railway station in the municipality of Münchenstein, in the Swiss canton of Basel-Landschaft. It is an intermediate stop on the Basel–Biel/Bienne line and is served by local trains only.

Connection is available to Line 10 of the Basel tram network, which uses the line between Dornach and Basel.

Services 
Münchenstein is served by the S3 of the Basel S-Bahn:

 : half-hourly service from Porrentruy or Laufen to Olten.

References

External links 
 
 

Railway stations in Basel-Landschaft
Swiss Federal Railways stations